The College of Environmental Design, also known as the Berkeley CED, or simply CED, is one of fourteen schools and colleges at the University of California, Berkeley. The school is located in Bauer Wurster Hall on the southeast corner of the main UC Berkeley campus. It is composed of three departments: the Department of Architecture, the Department of City and Regional Planning, and the Department of Landscape Architecture and Environmental Planning.

CED is consistently ranked as one of the most prestigious design schools in the United States and the world. The Graduate Program in Architecture is currently ranked No. 6 in the world through QS World University Rankings subject rankings. The Architecture program has also been recognized as the top public program by the journal DesignIntelligence and is currently ranked No. 6 in the United States. The Urban Planning program is currently ranked No. 2 by Planetizen.

History 
In 1894, Bernard Maybeck was appointed instructor in drawing at the Civil Engineering College of the University of California. A school of architecture did not yet exist. The School of Architecture at Berkeley was developed by John Galen Howard in 1903 followed by the School of Landscape Architecture, established by John William Gregg, which began instruction in 1913 and City Planning in 1948. In order to encourage an atmosphere of interdisciplinary study, the three schools, with the Department of Decorative Arts, were brought under one roof and the College of Environmental Design was founded in 1959 by, William Wurster, T.J Kent, Catherine Bauer Wurster, and Vernon DeMars. Originally, the school was located in North Gate Hall. Bauer Wurster Hall, the building which currently houses the college opened in 1964 and was designed by Joseph Esherick, Vernon DeMars, and Donald Olsen, members of the CED faculty.

One of the CED's early innovations during the 1960s was the development of the "four-plus-two" ("4+2") course of study for architecture students, meaning a four-year non-professional Bachelor of Arts in Architecture degree followed by a two-year professional Master of Architecture (M.Arch) degree. The 4+2 program was meant to address the shortfalls of the traditional 5-year professional Bachelor of Architecture (B.Arch) program, which many architecture educators felt was too rushed and neglected the undergraduate's intellectual development in favor of a strong emphasis on practical design knowledge. The 4+2 program allowed one to receive a broader education including exposure to the liberal arts as an undergraduate and thus a deeper and more thorough education in architectural design as a graduate student. CED was also an early proponent of design for disability and green architecture, and is home to the Center for the Built Environment.

In 2009–2010, the College of Environmental Design marked its 50th anniversary with a year-long series of events that paid tribute to CED's history and legacy, and engaged the college community in a lively discussion about its future.

In March 2015, the college unveiled a  3D-printed sculpture, entitled "Bloom", which was composed of an iron oxide-free Portland cement powder. This was the first printed structure of its type.

Undergraduate programs 
 Bachelor of Arts, Architecture
 Bachelor of Arts, Landscape Architecture
 Bachelor of Arts, Sustainable Environmental Design
 Bachelor of Arts, Urban Studies

Graduate programs 
 Master of Architecture
 Master of Design
 Master of Urban Design
 Master of City Planning
 Master of Landscape Architecture
 Master of Real Estate Development and Design
Master of Science, Architecture
Ph.D., Architecture
 Ph.D., City and Regional Planning
 Ph.D., Landscape Architecture and Environmental Planning

Alumni and faculty

Notable alumni 

 Hans Hollein, Pritzker Prize Laureate
 David Baker
 Kofi Bonner
 Alice Ross Carey
 Yung Ho Chang, head of the Department of Architecture at MIT
 Vishaan Chakrabarti, architect
 Thomas Church
 Edward Cullinan, 2008 recipient of the RIBA Royal Gold Medal
 Charles M. Eastman, pioneer of CAD and building information modeling systems for architecture.
 Walter Hood
 Norman Jaffe
 Jim Jennings
 Wes Jones
 Ray Kappe, founder of the Southern California Institute of Architecture
 G. Albert Lansburgh
 Gertrude Comfort Morrow
 Irving Morrow, designer of the Golden Gate Bridge
 Robert Murase, noted landscape architect
 Eric Owen Moss, director of the Southern California Institute of Architecture
 Vladimir Ossipoff
 Margaret Read
 Ananya Roy
 Robert Royston
 Stanley Saitowitz
 Frederic Schwartz
 Barbara Stauffacher Solomon
 Edwin Lewis Snyder
 Marilyn Jordan Taylor, chairman of Skidmore, Owings & Merrill and dean of the University of Pennsylvania School of Design
 Bing Thom
 Peter Walker
 Harvey Wiley Corbett
 Gwendolyn Wright
 Michael Woo, dean of the Cal Poly Pomona College of Environmental Design, and current Los Angeles planning commissioner.
 Ridwan Kamil, 15th Governor of West Java, Indonesia

Current faculty

Architecture 

 Andrew Atwood
 Mark Anderson
 R. Gary Black
 Jean-Paul Bourdier
 Gail Brager
 Dana Buntrock
 Tom J. Buresh
 Luisa Caldas
 Chris Calott
 Greg Castillo
 Marco Cenzatti
 Vishaan Chakrabarti
 Raveevarn Choksombatchai
 Renee Chow
 Mary Comerio
 Margaret Crawford
 Roddy Creedon
 Greig Crysler
 René Davids
 Nicholas de Monchaux
 William di Napoli
 Darell Fields
 Danelle Guthrie
 M. Paz Gutierrez
 Lisa Iwamoto
 Ajay Manthripragada
 Rudabeh Pakravan
 Keith Plymale
 Ronald Rael
 Charles Salter
 Stefano Schiavon
 Simon Schleicher
 Andrew Shanken
 Kyle Steinfeld
 Neyran Turan
 Susan Ubbelohde

City and Regional Planning 

 Charisma Acey
 Sai Balakrishnan
 Teresa Caldeira
Karen Chapple
 Daniel Chatman
 Stephen Collier
 Jason Corburn
 Karen Frick
 Carol Galante
 Marta Gonzalez
 Zachary Lamb
 Carolina Reid
 Daniel Rodríguez
 Annalee Saxenian
 Paul Waddell
 Jennifer Wolch

Landscape Architecture and Environmental Planning 

 Peter Bosselmann
 Anna Livia Brand
 Danika Cooper
 Iryna Dronova
 Kristina Hill
 Richard Hindle
 Walter Hood
 G. Kondolf
 Karl Kullmann
 Elizabeth Macdonald
 David Meyer
 Louise Mozingo
 John Radke
 Chip Sullivan

Former faculty 

 Donald Olsen
 Nezar AlSayyad
 Christopher Alexander, Professor Emeritus and developer of the Pattern Language
 Donald Appleyard
 Catherine Bauer Wurster
 Charles Benton
 Denise Scott Brown, partner in Venturi, Scott Brown and Associates
 Gary Brown
 Vernon DeMars
 Neil Denari
 Penny Dhaemers
 Charles Eames
 Garrett Eckbo
 Joseph Esherick, 1989 recipient of the AIA Gold Medal
 Norma Evenson
 Richard Fernau
 Paul Groth
 Sir Peter Hall
 John Galen Howard, founder of the Department of Architecture
 Sara Ishikawa
 Allan Jacobs
 Spiro Kostof
 Lars Lerup
 Donlyn Lyndon
 Aaron Marcus, graphic designer
 Clare Cooper Marcus
 Richard L. Meier, sustainable planning expert
 Bernard Maybeck
 Mike Martin
 Erich Mendelsohn
 Roger Montgomery
 Charles Moore, 1992 recipient of the AIA Gold Medal
 Richard Peters
 Jean-Pierre Protzen
 Horst Rittel
 Stanley Saitowitz
 Geraldine Knight Scott
 Daniel Solomon
 Claude Stoller
 Jill Stoner
 Stephen Tobriner
 Marc Treib
 Dell Upton
 Sim Van der Ryn
 William Wurster, 1969 recipient of the AIA Gold Medal

See also 

 Center for the Built Environment
 UrbanSim

References 
Notes

Citations

External links 
 

College of Environmental Design
Architecture schools in California
Educational institutions established in 1959
1959 establishments in California